The thespian grass mouse or hocicudo-like akodont (Akodon mimus) is a species of rodent in the family Cricetidae.
It is found in Bolivia and Peru.

References

Akodon
Mammals described in 1901
Taxonomy articles created by Polbot